Martin Laurendeau (born July 10, 1964) is a former touring professional tennis player and the former coach and (non-playing) captain of the Canada Davis Cup team

Tennis career
A 6'3 right-hander, Laurendeau starred in collegiate tennis at Pepperdine University where he played between 1984 and 1987.  He finished his career with the second most career singles wins in school history with 80 and the third best singles winning percentage (.816).

During his pro career which stretched from 1986 to 1993, Laurendeau had a career ATP tour singles win–loss record of 36 and 60.  His best results were a round of 16 appearance in the 1988 U.S. Open and a third round appearance at 1991 Wimbledon, both in singles.  His best ranking was World No. 90 which he achieved in October 1988.  His tour doubles record stands at 15 and 33.

Laurendeau has been a tennis coach since 1994.  He became Davis Cup captain upon the resignation of Grant Connell in 2004.

Career finals

Singles (4–2)

External links
 
 
 

1964 births
Living people
Canadian expatriate sportspeople in the United States
Canadian male tennis players
Canadian tennis coaches
Olympic tennis players of Canada
Pepperdine Waves men's tennis players
Tennis players from Montreal
Tennis players at the 1988 Summer Olympics